Senator Barkley may refer to:

Alben W. Barkley (1877–1956), U.S. Senator from Kentucky from 1927 to 1949 and from 1955 to 1956
Dean Barkley (born 1950), U.S. Senator from Minnesota from 2002 to 2003
James R. Barkley (1869–1948), Iowa State Senate

See also
Senator Barclay (disambiguation)